Siri Svegler (born 15 April 1980) is a Swedish-born actress, singer and songwriter. She played the Greek character Polydora in the film Troy.
In 2009 her debut album "Silent Viewer" was released. One of her well-known songs is "Their Wine".

Biography 

Siri Svegler was born and raised in Gothenburg, Sweden. In 2000 she left her home
to start her studies at the renowned Arts Educational School in London. Apart from working as a Jazz Singer along
famous musicians such as Christian Vaughan she also appeared on the big screen - in Wolfgang Petersen´s
historical epic Troy (2004) and The Line of Beauty.
After moving to Berlin in 2007, Siri Svegler, selected by Popstar SEAL, won the VW
Soundfoundation contest and the award for “Best Newcomer Pop” for her debut album "Silent Viewer" in 2008.
Her latest album "Lost & Found" was awarded "Album of the year" (English-speaking) by the 31st GERMAN ROCK AND POP AWARDS.

Currently, she lives and works in Berlin, Germany.

Musical career 
During her time in London, Svegler was the lead singer of the Band "Guido Sol" and was part of various Jazz projects.
Her first album, “Silent Viewer” was released by the label Compost in 2009. Her music combines Jazz, Rock, Blues and Pop elements all with poetic lyrics and a stunning voice. Siri writes all her songs herself – including Soundtrack material. Her latest single, “Beautiful Losers” is the main track of the German movie Gangsterläufer. Her second album, Lost & Found, was released July 19, 2013. "Paperdoll Dress" and "Coming up Roses" are included on the Soundtrack for the German movie-epos .

Filmography

External links 

 
 Official Homepage

References

 http://www.sirisvegler.com
 https://www.imdb.com/name/nm1595495/
 http://www.grooveattack.com/tag/siri-svegler/
 http://www.deutschlandradiokultur.de/lost-found.1328.de.html?dram:article_id=254544

1980 births
Living people
Swedish actresses